A security deposit is a sum of money held in trust either as an initial part-payment in a purchasing process (often used to prevent the seller's selling an item to someone else during an agreed period of time while the buyer verifies the suitability of the item, or arranges finance), also known as an earnest payment, or else, in the course of a rental agreement to ensure the property owner against default by the tenant and for the cost of repair in relation to any damage explicitly specified in the lease and that did in fact occur.

In certain taxation regimes a deposit need not be declared as a part of the gross income of the receiving party (person or corporation) until either the depositing party or an arbitrator agrees the funds may be used for the intended purpose.

The United States Supreme Court ruled in Commissioner v. Indianapolis Power & Light Co. (1990) that a deposit differs from an advance payment because the depositing party has dominion over the funds and retains the right to insist upon repayment in cash. On the other hand, the party making an advance payment retains no right to insist upon the return of the funds as long as the recipient fulfills the contractual agreement.

The rationale behind the court's decision is that the recipient of the deposit does not enjoy “complete dominion” over the funds and is subject to an express obligation to repay so long as the customer fulfills their legal obligations. Additionally, both the timing and the method of refund are largely within the control of the depositing party, as they can choose to insist upon repayment in cash or apply the deposit to purchase services. The recipient's right to retain the funds of the deposit is contingent upon events that are outside of their control.

Although the recipient may receive an economic benefit from the deposits – i.e. interest – the prospect that income will be generated provides no ground for taxing the principal. However, any income that the recipient may earn through the use of the deposit money will be taxable.

In leasing
Security deposits are required most often by lessors of automobiles, apartments, and commercial real estate.

The security deposits required by many residential landlords of their tenants are the source of much dispute and litigation. Many states and municipalities have enacted laws that specifically regulate the landlord's ability to withhold tenant security deposits after a tenant moves out. Some states and cities require that interest be paid to the tenant as it is earned on the security deposit. The rate of interest earned on security deposits typically changes each year. Currently this rate is set at .06% in the state of Connecticut. The rate is .01% in Chicago, Illinois, but this rate is only payable on buildings with a certain occupancy threshold.

A landlord's deductions from a tenant's security deposit must be reasonable. The landlord may make deductions for missing rent payments and for damages beyond ordinary wear and tear, which is the subject matter's depreciation or deterioration in value by reasonable and ordinary use by the tenant. Examples of non-deductible wear and tear include: paint retouching, minor cleaning, small tack holes, and nicks and scratches. Examples of deductible damages include large or excessive holes in the wall, carpet stains, and broken doors and windows.

If a landlord wrongfully withholds a tenant's security deposit, the tenant may be entitled to additional damages beyond the amount of the security deposit. These may include statutory damages for violation of a local statute on consumer collection practices, damages that may be two or three times the amount of the deposit (in some states, such as California), consequential (resulting) damages, interest, and in more rare instances punitive damages.

In some legal regimes the deposit has to be placed with an independent escrow agent or licensed deposit taker such as a bank so that the risk of fraud is reduced and the funds earn interest at a fair market rate.

Often car rental and car leasing companies will require a deposit to protect themselves against possible damage to the car. Once the car is returned, it is checked for any possible damage, and if damage is found, funds are deducted from the deposit to cover the repairs and the loss of value.

In the United States, Washington, DC, Alaska, Illinois, and Wisconsin have notably more tenant-friendly legislation than states like Indiana or Michigan, for example. The cities of Madison, Wisconsin, and Chicago, Illinois, have substantially greater protection of tenants' security deposit rights than the surrounding areas.

Studies have shown that landlords often improperly withhold security deposits after tenants move out, and often get away with it because it's too much trouble to fight.

In metropolitan cities of India like Chennai, Bangalore, Mumbai or others, there is security deposit to be given upfront to the landlord before renting/leasing an apartment. This security deposit amount can range anywhere from 3– 11 months, depending upon city's norm. With rentals soaring high in metropolitan cities, this amount becomes exorbitant. Hence, anyone shifting an apartment or moving cities in lieu to job change, finds it difficult financially. It is a dent on savings as this cost is not borne by the company that has helped the shifter's movers and packers.

The recent changes to the condominium and cooperative laws in New York have created limits for the regulations behind security deposits. Cooperative boards can no longer charge more than one month of prepaid maintenance and another month's maintenance as a security deposit restricting the amount to be owed before moving in.

In states like Connecticut that tend to be more tenant friendly, the amount an owner can charge for a security deposit in any property is limited to the equivalent of two month's rent. This limit is reduced to one month's rent for tenants age 62 and over.

See also

 Collateral (finance)
 Damage deposit
 Deposit (finance)
 Earnest payment
 Escrow
 Key money
 Lease

References

Bibliography
 Donaldson, Samuel A. Federal Income Taxation Of Individuals: Cases, Problems and Materials (2nd ed.). St. Paul: Thomson West, 2007. pg. 145.

Income taxation
Renting
Real property law